The Takaka Terrane is a Paleozoic terrane that outcrops in the South Island of New Zealand.  It is most extensively exposed within the Kahurangi National Park in the Tasman District. The terrane is mostly made up of marble and volcanic rocks but is highly variable in composition.  It ranges in age from mid-Cambrian to Devonian time (510–400 Ma), including New Zealand's oldest rocks, which are found in the Cobb Valley in north-west Nelson. The Cobb Valley is also the location of "Trilobite Rock" a glacial dropstone made from the moulted exoskeletons of trilobites. Asbestos was mined in the Cobb Valley from the Takaka Terrene between the late 1880s and 1917. The Takaka Terrane is highly deformed and has been intruded by many batholiths.

Description 
The Takaka Terrane has two main igneous units, the arc-related Devil River Volcanics Group (Middle to Late Cambrian) and the rift‐related Gendarme Dolerite (latest Cambrian to Early Ordovician age). The Devil River Volcanics Group sediments contain trilobites, brachiopods and conodonts. Sedimentary units in the Takaka Terrane (Haupiri Group and Junction Formation rocks) likely formed in a back-arc basin. The distinctive Arthur Marble from Takaka Hill and Mount Arthur is of Ordovician age. It has been speculated that the Takaka Terrane is equivalent to rocks in Tasmania, Australia and was separated from them with the opening of the Tasman Sea.

The Arthur Marble has been chemically weathered by rain and groundwater due to its high calcium carbonate content forming a karst geomorphology.  This has led to the formation of extensive cave systems like Harwood Hole and the Riuwaka Resurgence.

See also 

 Geology of the Tasman District
 Stratigraphy of New Zealand
 Torlesse Composite Terrane
 Dun Mountain-Maitai Terrane

References 

Terranes
Geology of New Zealand
Paleozoic Oceania
Landforms of the Tasman District